Billiards and Snooker were first included in the Southeast Asian Games at the 1987 Southeast Asian Games in Jakarta.

Medalists

Men

English Billiards Singles

English Billiards Singles (500 points)

English Billiards Doubles

English Billiards Scotch Doubles

English Billiards Team

Snooker Singles

Snooker Doubles

Snooker Team

1 Cushion Billiards Singles

3 Cushion Billiards Singles

47/1 Balkline Billiards Singles

Straight Rail Billiards Singles

6-Red Snooker Singles

6-Red Snooker Doubles

8 Ball Singles

8 Ball Doubles

9 Ball Singles

9 Ball Doubles

9 Ball Team

10 Ball Singles

Rotation Singles

Rotation Doubles

Rotation Team

Women

8 Ball Singles

9 Ball Singles

9 Ball Doubles

10 Ball Singles

6-Red Snooker Singles

See also
Cue sports at the Asian Games

References